Citharinus is a genus of lutefishes from tropical Africa, with six currently described species:
 Citharinus citharus (É. Geoffroy Saint-Hilaire, 1809)
 C. c. citharus (É. Geoffroy Saint-Hilaire, 1809) (moon fish)
 C. c. intermedius Worthington, 1932
 Citharinus congicus Boulenger, 1897
 Citharinus eburneensis Daget, 1962
 Citharinus gibbosus Boulenger, 1899
 Citharinus latus J. P. Müller & Troschel, 1844
 Citharinus macrolepis Boulenger, 1899

References
 

Characiformes genera
Taxa named by Georges Cuvier